Diocese of Sambalpur may refer to:

Roman Catholic Diocese of Sambalpur
Diocese of Sambalpur (Church of North India)